"Rain, Rain, Rain" is a song, originally released in English in 1973 by German singer and music producer Simon Butterfly (real name: Bernd Simon).

In the same year it was adapted into French under the title "Viens, viens" and recorded by Marie Laforêt, and in Italian as "Lei, lei" and was recorded by both Dalida and Laforet.

Background and writing 
The original was produced by Bernd Simon (Simon Butterfly) himself.

Charts 
 "Rain, Rain Rain" by Simon Butterfly

 "Viens, viens" by Marie Laforêt

References

External links 
 Simon Butterfly — "Rain, Rain, Rain" (single) at Discogs
 Marie Laforet — "Viens, viens" (single) at Discogs

Songs about weather
1973 songs
1973 singles
French songs
Marie Laforêt songs
Polydor Records singles
Song articles with missing songwriters